The Diamond is a 30-storey,  skyscraper office building completed in 2021 and located in Neihu District, Taipei, Taiwan. The building serves as the new corporate headquarters of the Taiwanese constructions company Chong Hong Construction Co.,Ltd.

See also 
 List of tallest buildings in Taiwan
 List of tallest buildings in Taipei

References

2021 establishments in Taiwan
Skyscraper office buildings in Taipei
Office buildings completed in 2021